= Geoffrey Wasteneys =

Canadian biologist

- Scientific career
- Fields: Biology
- Institutions: University of British Columbia

Geoffrey Wasteneys is a Canadian biologist, currently at University of British Columbia and a Canada Research Chair in Plant Cell Biology.
